Clarence Lemuel Elisha Moore (12 May 1876, in Bainbridge, Ohio – 5 December 1931) was an American mathematics professor, specializing in algebraic geometry and Riemannian geometry. He is chiefly remembered for the memorial eponymous C. L. E. Moore instructorship at the Massachusetts Institute of Technology; this prestigious instructorship has produced many famous mathematicians, including three Fields medal winners: Paul Cohen, Daniel Quillen, and Curtis T. McMullen.

C. L. E. Moore received his B.Sc. from Ohio State University (1901) and then his A.M. (1902) and Ph.D. (1904) from Cornell University. His doctoral dissertation was entitled Classification of the surfaces of singularities of the quadratic spherical complex with Virgil Snyder as thesis advisor. Moore also studied geometry at the University of Göttingen, the University of Turin with Corrado Segre, and the University of Bonn  with Eduard Study. In 1904 Moore joined the MIT mathematics department as an instructor and was successively promoted to assistant professor, associate professor, and full professor.  In 1920 he was one of the founders of the MIT Journal of Mathematics and Physics. He remained at MIT until his death in 1931 following a surgical operation.

Selected publications

References

19th-century American mathematicians
20th-century American mathematicians
Ohio State University alumni
Cornell University alumni
Massachusetts Institute of Technology faculty
1876 births
1931 deaths
Mathematicians from Ohio
People from Bainbridge, Ross County, Ohio